Sri Ranganatha Ramayanamu (శ్రీ రంగనాథ రామాయణము) is one of the most famous adaptions of the Valmiki Ramayana in Telugu, a Dravidian language spoken by the people of Andhra Pradesh and Telangana. Telugu has a very rich literary tradition, starting in the 11th century A.D. Although there are more than forty adaptions of the Valmiki Ramayana which are partly or completely in Telugu, only four adaptions have covered the entire theme of the original epic. They are Ranganatha Ramayana, Bhaskar Ramayana, Molla Ramayana, and Ramayana Kalpavriksham.

Ranganatha Ramayana was written by the poet Ranganatha—also known as Gona Budda Reddy—between 1300 and 1310 A.D. This Ramayana was composed in 17,290 couplets (in Dwipada metre). This meter is lyrical and can either be recited like the Valmiki Ramayana (written in Anustupa metre) or sung like the Ramcharitmanas (written in Doha-Chaupai). It is quite popular with both scholars and illiterates.

Structure and Manthara's Antagonism towards Rama.
Although Ranganatha follows the theme of the Valmiki Ramayana, he still made changes in some incidents which effects the course of events.
The theme of the Ranganatha Ramayana has been classified under seven cantos.
 Bala Kanda (Chapter: Childhood; బాల కాండ): This covers the theme starting from the conversation between Valmiki and Narada to the return of Rama to Ayodhya after his marriage with Sita from Mithila.This canto describes an incident connected with young Rama and Manthara (whereas in the Valmiki Ramayana, Manthara's entry is in Ayodhya kanda). When Rama was playing with a ball and a stick, suddenly Manthara threw the ball far away from Rama. In anger, Rama struck her on the knee with the stick and her knee was broken. This message was conveyed to king Dasaratha by Kaikeyi. The king decided to send Rama and his other sons to school. This incident makes the king to think about his responsibility of educating his sons, so that they can learn and become wise. Manthara had developed a kind of antagonism towards Rama and was waiting for an opportunity to take revenge against him.
 Ayodhya Kanda (Chapter: Ayodhya; అయోధ్యకాండ) 
 Aranya Kanda (Chapter: Forest; అరణ్యకాండ)
 Kishkindha Kanda (Chapter: Kishkindha; కిష్కిందకాండ )
 Sundara Kanda (Chapter: Beautiful;సుందరకాండ )
 Yudha Kanda (Chapter: War;యుద్ధకాండ)
 Uttara Kanda (Chapter: Last;ఉత్తరకాండ)

Blessing of Squirrel
Ranganatha added some significant incidents to make the theme more natural and reliable. For example, when the bridge was built, a squirrel thinks that it should help Sri Rama to achieve his end; it dips in the sea water, rolls down in the sand and gets rid of the sand in the middle of the rocks under construction. Knowing this, Sri Rama blesses squirrel for its devotion and draws three lines on its back with his fingers. The three white lines on the back of squirrels are supposed to have come into existence in this way.

References

Telugu-language literature
Works based on the Ramayana
14th-century literature